Khirwar (also called Khirwara, Kherwari, or Kalari) is a Dravidian language spoken by the Kharwar tribe in Surguja district of Chhattisgarh in India.

References

Dravidian languages